Sylvester Musonda (born 20 December 1973) is a Zambian footballer. He played in one match, scoring two goals, for the Zambia national football team in 1997. He was also named in Zambia's squad for the 1998 African Cup of Nations tournament.

References

External links
 

1973 births
Living people
Zambian footballers
Zambia international footballers
1998 African Cup of Nations players
Place of birth missing (living people)
Association footballers not categorized by position